Yttrium(III) sulfate is an inorganic compound with the formula Y2(SO4)3. The most common form is the anhydrate and octahydrate.

Reactions
Yttrium sulfate can form double salts such as MY(SO4)2 and M3Y(SO4)3:
 Y2(SO4)3 +  M2SO4 → 2 MY(SO4)2
 Y2(SO4)3 + 3 M2SO4 → 2 M3Y(SO4)3 (M=alkali metals)

Synthesis
Yttrium(III) sulfate can be prepared using either corresponding oxide, hydroxide or carbonate.
 2 Y(OH)3 + 3 H2SO4 → Y2(SO4)3 + 6 H2O

References

Sulfates
Yttrium compounds